Solangi Kharal is a village of central Punjab in Pakistan. It is situated on the main highway from Gujranwala to Sargodha. Solangi Kharal is composed of two words "Solangi" who was a man who was the first man who live there and "kharal" is a Jatt sub-caste which is the most common caste there. Solangi Kharal obtained the status of Union council in 2016 local elections. Kharal is the most common caste of Hafizabad District, 86 village of that district composed of that cast. Solangi kharal is most populous and most modern village of Hafizabad District. It is an industrial village having two main industries of rice and jute and two small mills of rice. Solangi Kharal has top rice exporters known as Malik Muhammad Jahangir and Malik Muhammad Khalid Kharal. It has a population of 4,800, with 2,243 registered to vote.

References

Villages in Hafizabad District